The 2019–2020 Israel Football League season was the 13th season of the Israel Football League. The season began on November 28, 2019 and was scheduled to conclude on March 19, 2020 with IsraBowl XIII. However, after the regular season concluded all games were postponed until further notice  due to the COVID-19 pandemic.

Regular season

References 

Israel Football League Seasons